The 2018 Libéma Open was a tennis tournament played on outdoor grass courts. It was the 29th edition of the event, and part of the 250 Series of the 2018 ATP World Tour, and of the WTA International tournaments of the 2018 WTA Tour. Both the men's and the women's events took place at the Autotron park in Rosmalen, 's-Hertogenbosch, Netherlands, from June 11 through June 17, 2018.

ATP singles main-draw entrants

Seeds

 1 Rankings are as of May 28, 2018.

Other entrants
The following players received wildcards into the main draw:
  Tallon Griekspoor
  Mackenzie McDonald 
  Stefanos Tsitsipas

The following players received entry from the qualifying draw:
  Alex Bolt 
  Max Purcell
  Franko Škugor 
  Bernard Tomic

The following players received entry as lucky losers:
  Kevin King
  John-Patrick Smith
  Tim Smyczek

Withdrawals
Before the tournament
  Alexandr Dolgopolov → replaced by  Kevin King
  Tallon Griekspoor → replaced by  John-Patrick Smith
  Ryan Harrison → replaced by  Malek Jaziri
  Pierre-Hugues Herbert → replaced by  Tim Smyczek
  Filip Krajinović → replaced by  Marius Copil
  Karen Khachanov → replaced by  Evgeny Donskoy
  Lu Yen-hsun → replaced by  Yuki Bhambri
  Andy Murray → replaced by  Vasek Pospisil
  Tennys Sandgren → replaced by  Jérémy Chardy

ATP doubles main-draw entrants

Seeds

1 Rankings are as of May 28, 2018

Other entrants
The following pair received wildcards into the doubles main draw:
  Alex Bolt /  Lleyton Hewitt

The following pair received entry as alternates:
  Marius Copil /  Stefanos Tsitsipas

Withdrawals
Before the tournament
  Tallon Griekspoor

WTA singles main-draw entrants

Seeds

 1 Rankings are as of May 28, 2018.

Other entrants
The following players received wildcards into the main draw:
  Richèl Hogenkamp
  Anna Kalinskaya 
  Bibiane Schoofs

The following players received entry from the qualifying draw:
  Anna Blinkova
  Valentini Grammatikopoulou
  Veronika Kudermetova
  Antonia Lottner
  Marina Melnikova 
  Fanny Stollár

The following player received entry as a lucky loser:
  Tereza Martincová

Withdrawals
Before the tournament
  Magda Linette → replaced by  Tereza Martincová
  Sabine Lisicki → replaced by  Viktória Kužmová
  Lesia Tsurenko → replaced by  Ekaterina Alexandrova

WTA doubles main-draw entrants

Seeds

1 Rankings are as of May 28, 2018.

Other entrants
The following pairs received wildcards into the doubles main draw:
  Richèl Hogenkamp /  Bibiane Schoofs 
  Arantxa Rus  /  Eva Wacanno

Retirements
  Kirsten Flipkens

Champions

Men's singles

  Richard Gasquet def.  Jérémy Chardy, 6–3, 7–6(7–5)

Women's singles

  Aleksandra Krunić def.  Kirsten Flipkens, 6–7(0–7), 7–5, 6–1

Men's doubles

  Dominic Inglot /  Franko Škugor def.  Raven Klaasen /  Michael Venus, 7–6(7–3), 7–5

Women's doubles

  Elise Mertens /  Demi Schuurs def.  Kiki Bertens /  Kirsten Flipkens, 3–3, retired.

References

External links 
 

Libéma Open
Libéma Open
Libéma Open
Libéma Open